Irina Bazilevskaya (born 11 August 1970) is a Belarusian rower. She competed in the women's eight event at the 2000 Summer Olympics.

References

External links
 

1970 births
Living people
Belarusian female rowers
Olympic rowers of Belarus
Rowers at the 2000 Summer Olympics
Sportspeople from Brest, Belarus